Stockport Carriage Sidings are located in Stockport, Greater Manchester, England, to the west of West Coast Main Line adjacent to Stockport railway station.

Present 
Stabling is provided for Class 150 and Class 156 Sprinters and Class 323 EMUs.

References

Sources

Railway sidings in England
Rail transport in Greater Manchester